lyrikline.org hosts contemporary international poetry as audio (read by the authors) and text (original versions & translations), plus bibliographies and biographies for each poet.

lyrikline.org was started in November 1999 as a German-language site. In November, 2000, lyrikline.org expanded into a multilingual platform. 
 
In November 2001, several institutions, including the Goethe-Institut and the Central and Regional Library for Berlin established a lyrikline.org network to promote the international exchange of poets, poetry and translations by supporting the web site.

lyrikline.org is a project supported by the German Commission for UNESCO and of the former president of the German Parliament, Wolfgang Thierse. lyrikline.org was honored as a notable cultural project with the United Nations Logo for 2001 “Year of Dialogue among Civilizations.” In 2005, lyrikline.org won the Grimme Online Award for Culture and Entertainment, the jury stating that it was an outstanding combination of content, form and function. In 2008 it was given the title Ort im Land der Ideen ("Landmark in the Land of Ideas") during the Literaturwerkstatt Berlin (Literature Workshop of Berlin).

703 poets, 6334 poems, 55 mother tongues and 7665 translations into 52 languages.

References

External links
 lyrikline.org
 Literaturwerkstatt Berlin (Literature Workshop of Berlin)

Poetry organizations
Literary translation websites